Lucecita may refer to:
 Lucecita (TV series), a Venezuelan telenovela 
 Lucecita Benítez, also known as Lucecita, Puerto Rican singer